Julianne E. Ortman (born August 29, 1962) is a Minnesota politician and former member of the Minnesota Senate. A member of the Republican Party of Minnesota, she represented District 47, which included portions of Carver County in the southwestern Twin Cities metropolitan area. She was a candidate in the 2014 United States Senate election in Minnesota until she was eliminated at the state convention.

Early life, education, and career
Ortman graduated from Macalester College in Saint Paul in 1986, then went on to the University of Pennsylvania Law School in Philadelphia, Pennsylvania, graduating with a J.D. in 1989. She was an adjunct professor at George Washington University in Washington, D.C. from 1992 to 1994.

Ortman served as a Carver County Commissioner from 2001 to 2003. She is an attorney by profession, heading up Ortman & Associates law firm in Chanhassen. She has also worked as the chief financial manager for the Hennepin County Sheriff's Department since 2007.

Minnesota Senate
Ortman was first elected to the Senate in 2002, and was reelected in 2006, 2010 and 2012. She served as an assistant minority leader during the 2007-2008 legislative session. On January 3, 2012, Ortman was named Deputy Majority Leader by Majority Leader Dave Senjem. Ortman replaced Sen. Geoff Michel, who lost his position in a shake-up of Republican leadership following the resignation of former Majority Leader Amy Koch. She did not seek re-election in 2016.

2014 United States Senate campaign

On August 3, 2013, Ortman announced her candidacy in the 2014 United States Senate election in Minnesota.  Ortman was endorsed by former Governor of Alaska Sarah Palin in March 2014.
She was eliminated at the May Convention in the 5th round of voting by delegates, with 19.97% of the votes, falling just 1 vote shy of the 20% needed to advance to the 6th round.

Other
Ortman serves on various government and community boards and organizations. She has been a director on the Southwest Transportation Coalition since 2001, and is a member of the Minnesota Regional Rail Authority. She is chair of the Instate Compact on Sentencing, and a member of the Minnesota Compensation Council. She has also been a trustee of the Metropolitan Regional Library Association since 2000.

On February 21, 2008, Ortman requested that the Subcommittee on ethics determine whether she had a conflict of interest as chief author of two bills, SF294 and SF2984, due to her employment as the Finance Director in the Office of the Hennepin County Sheriff.  The Subcommittee considered the issue on March 6, 2008, and concluded that she did not have a conflict of interest as the chief author of either of the two bills.

References

External links

Minnesota Public Radio Votetracker: Senator Julianne Ortman
Project Vote Smart - Senator Julianne Ortman Profile

1962 births
Living people
Republican Party Minnesota state senators
People from Carver County, Minnesota
Women state legislators in Minnesota
21st-century American politicians
21st-century American women politicians
University of Pennsylvania Law School alumni